Deborah Jane Yashar (born 1963) is an American political scientist. She is a Full Professor of Politics and International Affairs at the Princeton School of Public and International Affairs. Her research interests involve politics of children and immigration in the Americas.

Early life and education
Yashar was born in 1963 to parents of Iranian and Ukrainian descent. She earned her Bachelor of Arts from Brown University and her Master's degree and PhD from the University of California, Berkeley. She received a Fulbright Fellowship to conduct dissertation research in Guatemala.

Career
After earning her PhD, Yashar became a Junior faculty member in Harvard's department of Government and Committee on Degrees in Social Studies. In 1996, she became a Fellow at the Kellogg Institute For International Studies at University of Notre Dame. She also republished her dissertation "Demanding Democracy: Reform and Reaction in Costa Rica and Guatemala, 1870s-1950s" through the Stanford University Press. Two years later, she accepted an Assistant professor position at the Woodrow Wilson School of Public and International Affairs.

In 2005, Yashar published "Contesting Citizenship in Latin America: The Rise of Indigenous Movements and the Postliberal Challenge" through the Cambridge University Press, which examined how Latin American indigenous populations have mobilized. The book earned her the 2006 New England Council on Latin American Studies Best Book Award. A few years later, she was promoted to Full Professor of politics and international affairs. In 2009, Yashar, Atul Kohli, and sociologist Miguel Centeno received a grant from the Princeton Global Collaborative Research Fund for their research project "State-Building in the Developing World." She also co-edited Parties Movements and Democracy in the Developing World and Routledge Handbook of Latin American Politics.

In 2018, she published "Homicidal Ecologies: Illicit Economies and Complicit States in Latin America," a book which focused on the high and uneven homicide rates of Latin Americans. She was awarded the American Political Science Association Comparative Democratization Section 2019 Best Book Award. Yashar later became the Chair of the Editorial Board for the political science journal World Politics.

References

External links
Princeton profile

Living people
1963 births
Brown University alumni
University of California, Berkeley alumni
American women political scientists
American political scientists
Princeton University faculty
Political science journal editors
American women academics
21st-century American women